NGC 4567 and NGC 4568 (nicknamed the Butterfly Galaxies or Siamese Twins) are a set of unbarred spiral galaxies about 60 million light-years away in the constellation Virgo. They were both discovered by William Herschel in 1784. They are part of the Virgo Cluster of galaxies. 

These galaxies are in the process of colliding and merging with each other, as studies of their distributions of neutral and molecular hydrogen show, with the highest star-formation activity in the part where they overlap. However, the system is still in an early phase of interaction.

Only one supernova (SN 2004cc) was observed in the Butterfly Galaxies  until March 31, 2020, when the Zwicky Transient Facility detected the rapidly-rising SN 2020fqv in NGC 4568.

Naming controversy
The two galaxies were nicknamed "Siamese Twins" because they appear to be connected. On August 5, 2020, NASA announced that they would not use that nickname in an effort to avoid systemic discrimination in their terminology.

See also 

 Antennae Galaxies
 Eyes Galaxies

Notes

References

External links 
 Kopernik Space Images, Spiral Galaxies NGC 4568 and NGC 4567 aka "The Siamese Twins" : Supernova 2004cc, George Normandin (29 June 2004)
 Skyhound, The Siamese Twins
 SIMBAD, VCC 1673 : NGC 4567 -- Galaxy in Pair of Galaxies
 SIMBAD, VCC 1676 : NGC 4568 -- Galaxy in Pair of Galaxies
 NED, VV 219
 NED, NGC 4567
 NED, NGC 4568

Virgo (constellation)
Virgo Cluster
4567
42064
Interacting galaxies
Unbarred spiral galaxies
Overlapping galaxies